A BT site engineering code is a group of letters assigned by BT, or its predecessor the General Post Office, to a physical location which is equipped by the company with unusual amounts or types of telecommunications.

Such codes relate to both BT's own buildings and major customer sites.

Historically, site codes beginning with the letter Q were government or defence sites. Codes beginning with the letter Y were radio-related sites. The latter category broadened somewhat over time to include many other kinds of customer site.

Site engineering codes in alphabetical order

Q 

 QAAA Newmarket
 QAAR Acklington
 QACY Preston
 QACF Huntingdon
 QACX Preston
 QADB Bracknell
 QADF Staxton Wold
 QADN Cranwell
 QADH Watnall
 QAEH Stafford
 QAEL Kinloss
 QALD Aldergrove
 QAPA Leconfield
 QBAF Chippenham
 QBEN RAF Benson [Queen's Flight]
 QBFM Forest Moor
 QBIN Binbrook
 QBTY Bawtry (HQ 1Gp)
 QBUS Cambuslans
 QCAT Catterick
 QCBL Shrewsbury
 QCEA Carlisle
 QCEN Leighton Buzzard (Q-Central)
 QCHL Coltishall
 QCON Coningsby
 QCOS Cosford
 QCWL Chilwell
 QDIS Dishforth
 QDH Dollis Hill (GPO Research Station)
 QFIN Finningley
 QHKN Bathgate
 QJOA Towsbury House
 QHEM Helmswell
 QIVM Fylingdales
 QLDM Lindholm & Northern Radar
 QLIN Linton
 QLMG Leeming
 QMBY Manby
 QMET Kelvedon Hatch bunker (originally RAF Fighter Command 'Metropolitan Sector')
 QMHA North Luffenham
 QMID Midd Street Geodinsdle
 QNCC Lindholme (840SU)
 QNCT North Coates
 QNLO Preston
 QNRN Shipton
 QNTH Northwood
 QNWC RAF North West Signals Centre
 QOUS Ouston
 QPLY Plymouth
 QPTE Pitreavie
 QQAT Aldershot
 QQCA Preston
 QQCC Corsham
 QQFS Neatishead
 QQGF Chipenham
 QQGM Inverbervie
 QQGR Boulmer
 QQGU Anstruther
 QQJD Hack Green
 QQNB Craigie Hall
 QQRE York
 QRAA Boddington
 QSCD South Down
 QSCM Scampton
 QSTA Stanmore
 QSYE Syerston
 QTOP Topcliffe
 QTUR Barnton Quarry
 QUTA York Mil
 QUXB Uxbridge
 QVCA Glen Parva
 QWAC Harrogate
 QWAD Waddington
 QWAH RAF High Wycombe
 QWHI Whitehall

Y 

 YABR Albrighton
 YACW Arncliffe Wood
 YBAI Bagshot (Surrey Hill)
 YBCA Benbecula
 YBCL Blackcastle Hill
 YBFL Blackford Hill
 YBFM Charwelton
 YBGT Burngate
 YBMR BT Tower (Birmingham)
 YBNM Burnham
 YBNP Blaen Plwyf
 YBRA Barra
 YBRX Bruxie Hill
 YBTH Butser Hill
 YBUD Bury Down
 YBUR Burnhope
 YBYB Ballymena
 YCAG Caister
 YCAM Cambret Hill
 YCAW Mount Stamper
 YCBC Corby's Crag
 YCBY Claxby
 YCHI Chillerton Down
 YCLC Cullercoats New Radio Station
 YCMB Cambelt Hill
 YCOK Copt Oak
 YCOR Core Hill
 YCOZ Connel
 YCRA Craiglockhart Hill
 YCRG Craigowl Hill
 YCRR Corstorphine Hill Radio Stn. R. Site Bot.
 YCRT Corstorphine Hill Radio Stn. T. Site Bot.
 YCSM Five Ways
 YCSP Carlton Scroop
 YCSR Kelsall NATS station
 YCVW Cave Wold
 YDAC Dalton-in-Furness
 YDMH Deadmans Hill
 YDOG Douglas Radio Stn. Transmit Hut
 YDOR Dorchester
 YEAH East Harptree
 YECR Elstree Apparatus Room (BBC)
 YELM East Lomond Radio Station
 YFAS Fairseat
 YFAY Farley
 YFLW Flimwell
 YFOR Forder Battery
 YHFP Holborn Flexibility Point (deep level)
 YHOG TV-am Camden Town (Henlys Old Garage)
 YGFW Greenford
 YGHD Great Hatfield
 YGKP Greenock
 YGLB Gallanach Beg.
 YGOO Goosemoor
 YGOY Goonhilly
 YGPT Golden Pot
 YGRH Granite Hill
 YGRL Green Lowther
 YHAL Halwell
 YHAV Haverfordwest
 YHEA Heaton Park
 YHEY Heysham
 YHIL Hillingdon
 YHLY Hornsea
 YHMG Horwich
 YHTS Hunters Stones
 YHWD Harrow Weald
 YHZZM Dial House Manchester
 YINS Inskip
 YKEL Kelvedon Hatch
 YKIL Kilchiaran
 YKMV Kirtomy
 YKSH Kirk o'Shotts
 YKSH/WT Kirk O'Shotts BT
 YKUW Kirkby Underwood
 YLFM Lonely Farm
 YLGS BBC Lime Grove
 YLLG Llanllawddog
 YLST Lochinver R/S/Radio Stn.
 YLTH Lowther Hill
 YMAA Maaruig
 YMAG Mallaig
 YMLG Melvaig
 YMNM Mendlesham
 YMOR Morborne Hill
 YMUG Muggleswick
 YOKM Oakham
 YOVR Over
 YPCG Pencarreg
 YPGN Pye Green
 YPLC Pimlico
 YPPK Portpatrick Coastal Radio Station
 YPRE Preseli
 YPRH Proctor Heights
 YPTP Pontop Pike
 YPUR Purdown
 YQNR Quernmore
 YRID Riddings Hill
 YRIN Manchester (Ringway) Airport
 YRIV Rivington Pike (Winter Hill Broadcast TX)
 YRSM Rosemarkie
 YRXR Rothesay SHF Radio Stn.
 YSBR St Albans
 YSBY Sibleys
 YSCN Sutton Common
 YSHC Stoke Holy Cross
 YSHF Madley Satellite Earth Station (Street House Farm)
 YSHR Shanes Hill
 YSOM Somerton
 YSPF Sparsholt Firs
 YSRF Sheriff's Mountain R.V. Stn.
 YSRS Skriaig
 YSTK Stokenchurch
 YSTL Stillingfleet
 YSTS Standing Stones
 YSWH Swaffham
 YTAC Tacolneston
 Tatsfield
 YTHH Thornhill
 YTHL Turners Hill
 YTHM Tobermory SHF Radio Stn
 YTIL Tinshill
 YTIR Tirnascobe
 YTNL Thornton-in-Lonsdale
 YTOR Tor Sliasg
 YTOW BT Tower, London
 YTTH Two Top Hill
 YTVC BBC Television Centre
 YTYC Twycross
 YULL Ullapool
 YUPF Upton
 YWBH Wisbech
 YWCK Wickhambrook
 YWEN Wenallt
 YWFR Werfa
 YWHC Whinfell Common
 YWHK Whitehawk Hill
 YWHN Whitestone
 YWIL Windy Hill
 YWNY Wooler
 YWPE Wotton-under-Edge
 YYGU Guernsey State Radio Stn.
 YZAR BBC Broadcasting House London
 YZSK Skelton

Z 

 ZAK Humber Radio Stn.
 ZAM Anglesey Radio Stn.
 ZBA Bearley Radio Stn.
 ZBD Brentwood Radio Stn.
 ZBY Braewynner Radio Stn.
 ZHO Hopealone Radio Stn.
 ZIF Ilfracombe Radio Stn.

References 

BT Group
Telecommunications in the United Kingdom